Atlántida is a department located on the north Caribbean shore of Honduras, Central America. The capital is the port city of La Ceiba.

In the past few decades, tourism has become the most important legitimate economic source for the coastal area. In 2005 it had an estimated population of about 372,532 people. The department covers a total surface area of 4,251 km².

History

The department was formed in 1902 from territory previously parts of the departments of Colón, Cortés, and Yoro. In 1910 it had a population of about 11,370 people. La Ceiba is known as the night life city in the Atlántida department. With tourist coming from all over the world to enjoy a nice Caribbean weather and beach resorts, La Ceiba is the preferred destination. Another important city in the area is Tela. Similar to La Ceiba, Tela has incredible resorts and is known for the beach parties that make this city an attractive destination. San Juan Pueblo, a small town midway of La Ceiba and Tela is showing prosperity and quickly growing into one of the most industrialized towns.

Municipalities

Medical care

Medical care is available at the Jungle Hospital,
which is located in the village of Rio Viejo, 20.1 road kilometers south of La Ceiba in the valley of the Rio Cangrejal. From La Ceiba, one should take the Carretera a La Cuenca (V200) to Rio Viejo.

Once a year in July, a team from the Southside Church of Christ in Rogers, Arkansas come to Atlántida bringing prescription medication that is not normally available in the area or is very expensive locally. This mission effort is very supported by the locals, with thousands visiting the clinics set up.

References

 
Departments of Honduras
States and territories established in 1887